President's Trophy or Presidents' Trophy may refer to:
 Presidents' Trophy, a National Hockey League (NHL) award for the highest ranked team in the regular season
 Presidents' Trophy (U Sports), an award for best defensive player at university level in Canadian football
 President's trophy (Finland), an award conferred by the Finnish Ice Hockey Federation
 President's Trophy (Canucks MVP), a former award for most valuable player (MVP) given by the Vancouver Canucks ice hockey team
 President's Trophy Boat Race, a boat race in the Indian state of Kerala
 President’s Trophy Grade-I, a cricket tournament in Pakistan 
 President's Trophy Knockout Tournament, a schools rugby knockout in Sri Lanka

See also
 President's Cup (disambiguation)